Henri Louis de Rohan, Prince of Guéméné (Henri Louis Marie; 30 August 1745 – 24 April 1809), was a French courtier and the penultimate Grand Chamberlain of France.

Biography

Henri Louis was born in Paris, a member of the House of Rohan, which claimed ancestry relating to the Dukes of Brittany. He was the only son of the family's main branch chief, Jules Hercule Mériadec de Rohan, Prince of Guéméné, whereas his mother Marie Louise Henriette Jeanne de La Tour d'Auvergne (daughter of Charles Godefroy de La Tour d'Auvergne) had an illegitimate child with her lover, Charles Edward Stuart.

On 15 January 1761, he married his second cousin, Victoire Armande Josèphe de Rohan, daughter of Charles de Rohan, Prince de Soubise and Princess Anna Teresa of Savoy. The couple had five children, four of whom survived into adult age. The family owned the Hôtel de Rohan-Guémené on the Place des Vosges.

In 1775 Henri Louis was appointed Grand Chamberlain of France by Louis XVI, inasmuch as his uncle Godefroy Charles Henri de La Tour d'Auvergne, duke of Bouillon gave up that charge. The Princess of Guéméné also inherited a charge; she was appointed Governess of Royal Children.

From the 1780s on Henri Louis and his family was involved in personal and political scandals. In 1782, Henri Louis's mistress, Countess Thérèse Lucy de Dillon, the first wife of Arthur Dillon and a friend of his wife, succumbed to tuberculosis at 30 years; in the same year the Prince declared bankruptcy, with a debt of 33 million livres. He and Victoire abdicated their charges at the court and left Versailles. Their properties were sold, including the Hôtel de Rohan-Guéméné and their Mansion at Montreuil.

At the death of his father in law, he was the legal heir to the title Prince of Soubise.

During the French Revolution, Henri Louis and his father, wife and children fled to Habsburg monarchy, where he in Prague died in 1809, at the age 63 years (later in 1820 his family bought Sychrov Castle, where they built residence).

Issue

Charlotte Victoire Joséphe Henriette de Rohan (17 November 1761 - 15 December 1771), died aged ten
Charles Alain Gabriel de Rohan, Duke of Montbazon, Rohan and Guéméné; Prince of Guéméné (Versailles, 18 January 1764 - Paris, 24 April 1836); married in 1781:
Louise Aglae de Conflans d'Armentieres (1763–1819); had issue.
Marie Louise Joséphine de Rohan (13 April 1765 - Paris, 21 September 1839); married in 1780:
A cousin Charles Louis Gaspard de Rohan, Duke of Montbazon (1765–1843) and had issue.
, Duke of Rohan and Bouillon (Paris, 20 July 1766 - Czech Republic, 10 December 1846) married in 1800:
A niece Berthe de Rohan (1782–1841); had no issue.
 (Versailles, 20 October 1768 - Czech republic, 13 January 1836); married in 1800:
Princess Wilhelmine Catherine Frédérique Biron von Kurland, Duchess of Sagan (1781–1839); had no issue.

Ancestry

References

1745 births
1809 deaths
Nobility from Paris
Henri Louis Marie
18th-century French people
19th-century French people
Grand Chamberlains of France
Henri Louis
Henri Louis
Henri Louis
People of Byzantine descent